Ulpana (Hebrew: אוּלְפֶּנָה ) is a  girls-only Jewish high school in Israel, delivering intensive religious education, alongside the state curriculum.
The Ulpana is to be found primarily in the Religious Zionist community.
It is the equivalent of a Mamlachti dati boys-only yeshiva high school (“Yeshiva Tichonit”).
Post high school, women often proceed to study at a Midrasha, or to undertake Sherut Leumi.

See also
:He:אולפנה for further discussion and a listing of these

Bais Yaakov, Haredi elementary and secondary girls' schools
Single-sex education

Orthodox Jewish educational institutions
Religious Zionist yeshivot
Judaism and women
Orthodox Jewish schools for women